Bodi is a village in the commune of Bassila in the Donga Department of western Benin. It is located near the border with Togo. Bodi has a population of 10,221.

External links
Satellite map at Maplandia

Populated places in the Donga Department
Commune of Bassila